is a Japanese voice actor affiliated with the Sigma Seven talent agency. He was born in Shimonoseki, Yamaguchi Prefecture, and was raised in Sakai, Osaka Prefecture. He graduated from Waseda University.

On adult works, like OVAs or dating sims, he goes by the alias .

Overview

After graduation from Waseda University, Wakamoto initially found employment as a police officer assigned to the Tokyo Metropolitan Police Department's Anti-Riot Squad division before becoming a voice actor.

The quality of Wakamoto's voice is known for uniting astringency and sharpness, usually leading him to villain roles in dubbing work and games. Examples include Oskar von Reuenthal in Legend of the Galactic Heroes, Barbatos Goetia in Tales of Destiny 2, Charles zi Britannia in Code Geass, Black Shadow in F-Zero GP Legend, Xemnas in the Kingdom Hearts series, Oda Nobunaga in Sengoku Basara, Cell in Dragon Ball Z, and Count Dracula in various Castlevania titles, and DIO from JoJo's Bizarre Adventure drama CD's. Nonetheless, Wakamoto has played numerous less antagonistic roles such as Guilty Gear'''s Johnny, and has even lent his voice to comedic roles, including Mechazawa in Cromartie High School, The Narrator in Hayate the Combat Butler, Katakuriko Matsudaira in Gintama and Onsokumaru in Ninja Nonsense''.

Filmography

Anime

Film

Drama CDs

Live-action television narration

Video games

Unknown date
 Blue Dragon (Nene)
 Brave Story: New Traveler (Sogreth)
 Castlevania: Harmony of Dissonance (Dracula)
 Code Geass: Lost Colors (Emperor of Britannia)
 Crysis (Admiral Morrison,  Nanosuit Voice (In Promotion Video))
 Cyber Troopers Virtual-On Marz (DYMN/Daimon)
 Disgaea 2: Cursed Memories (Overlord Zenon)
 Disgaea 2: Dark Hero Days (Overlord Zenon)
 Dragon Ball Z: Budokai series (Cell)
 Dragon Ball Z: Budokai Tenkaichi series (Cell)
 Eien no Aselia: The Spirit of Eternity Sword (Eternity Sword 'Wisdom'/Takios the Black Blade)
 Everybody's Golf 6 (Izaak)
 Fantasy Earth: Zero (King Nias Ielsord) 
 Flash Hiders (Moonrize)
 GetAmped2 (Daigokuin Raizo)
 Grandia (Baal)
 inFAMOUS (Kessler)
 Koihime Musou (Chōsen)
 Last Bronx (Tōru Kurosawa)
 Maji de Watashi ni Koi Shinasai! (Prime Minister)
 Makai Kingdom: Chronicles Of The Sacred Tome (King Drake the Third)
 Metal Gear Solid: Portable Ops (Gene)
 Mobile Suit Gundam Side Story (Philip Hughes)
 Muv-Luv (Paul Radhabinod)
 Muv-Luv Alternative (Paul Radhabinod)
 Odin Sphere (Hindel, Wraith/Halja)
 Onimusha 3: Demon Siege (Akechi Mitsuhide)
 Onimusha: Dawn of Dreams (Ishida Mitsunari)
 Phantasy Star Universe (Renvolt Magashi)
 Princess Maker 4 (Daikun)
 Project X Zone 2 (M. Bison, Metal FAce)
 Rusty Hearts (Ian Jablonsky)
 Samurai Shodown: Edge of Destiny (Golba)
 SD Gundam G Generation series (Doku Dāmu, Philip Hughs)
 Sharin no Kuni, Himawari no Shōjo (Houzuki)
 Skies of Arcadia (Gilder)
 SNK vs. Capcom series (M. Bison)
 Star Ocean: First Departure (Ashlay Barnbelt)
 Summon Night EX-Thesis: Yoake no Tsubasa (Fighfar)
 Super Robot Wars series (Neue Regisseur, Stern Neue Regisseur, Maier V. Branstein, Alan Brady, Shapiro Keats, Ōta Kōichirō, Moon Will, Augustus)
 Super Smash Bros. for Nintendo 3DS and Super Smash Bros. for Wii U (Metal Face)
 Super Smash Bros. Ultimate (Metal Face)
 SVC Chaos: SNK vs. Capcom (M. Bison)
 Tales of Destiny (PS2) (Barbatos Goetia)
 Tales of Innocence (Gardle)
 Tales of the World: Narikiri Dungeon 3 (Barbatos Goetia)
 Tales of the World: Radiant Mythology 2 (Barbatos Goetia)
 Tales of Vesperia (Barbatos Goetia)
 Tales of VS. (Barbatos Goetia)
 Tenshi no Present - Marl Oukoku Monogatari (Fonfon, Guwanji)
 The Exiled Realm of Arborea (Samael Cranwood)
 Transformers: The Game (Megatron)
 Transformers: Revenge of the Fallen (Megatron)
 Tsuyokiss (Tachibana Heizō)
 Valkyrie Profile (Janus)
 Wild Arms Alter Code: F (Siegfried/Zeikfried)
 Xenoblade Chronicles (Mumkhar)
 Zettai Hero Kaizou Keikaku (Narrator)
 Tom Clancy's Splinter Cell: Conviction (Victor Coste) [2]

Tokusatsu

Overseas dubbing
Live-action

Animation

References

External links

 Official agency profile 
 Norio Wakamoto at Hitoshi Doi's Seiyuu Database
 Original Name Works Cited (archive) on lain.gr.jp 
 Wakamoto Norio profile (archive) on Animate.tv 
 Iyasare-radio, hosted by Wakamoto (archive) 
 
 

1945 births
Living people
Male voice actors from Yamaguchi Prefecture
People from Shimonoseki
Male voice actors from Osaka Prefecture
People from Sakai, Osaka
Japanese police officers
Japanese male video game actors
Japanese male voice actors
Kansai University alumni
Waseda University alumni
20th-century Japanese male actors
21st-century Japanese male actors
Internet memes
Film and television memes
Video game memes
Sigma Seven voice actors